Fragments of a Rainy Season is a 1992 live solo album by John Cale, performed at various locations during his 1992 tour. A 16-track DVD, recorded at the Centre for Fine Arts, Brussels (Palais des Beaux-Arts, now BOZAR) in Brussels, Belgium, that features the tracks in the order in which they were performed, was also released.  The album cover was designed by noted conceptual artist Joseph Kosuth.

Track listing
All songs composed by John Cale; except where indicated

Single
"Heartbreak Hotel" / "(I Keep A) Close Watch" / "You Know More Than I Know" / "Heartbreak Hotel" CD-EP France 1992. (2,3,4: previously unreleased performances)

"Where There's a Will" / "(I Keep A) Close Watch" / "You Know More Than I Know" / "Heartbreak Hotel" CD-EP France 1992. (all previously unreleased performances; came with the French music magazine Les Inrockuptiles, titled "More Fragments")

Personnel
John Cale - vocals, piano, guitar
Soldier String Quartet
Dave Soldier - violin and metal violin on "Heartbreak Hotel", string arrangements
Todd Reynolds - violin
Martha Mooke - viola
Dawn Avery - cello
with:
B.J. Cole - steel guitar

Notes
The album features a cover version of Leonard Cohen's Hallelujah. Cale's abridged version of Cohen's lyrics now form the basis of most other cover versions of the song, with the Cohen version being 15 verses long.

Charts

References

Albums produced by John Cale
John Cale live albums
1992 live albums
Hannibal Records albums
Cultural depictions of Dylan Thomas